The 2010–11 Furman Paladins men's basketball team represented Furman University in the 2010–11 NCAA Division I men's basketball season. The Paladins, led by head coach James Jackson, played their home games at Timmons Arena in Greenville, South Carolina, as members of the Southern Conference. The Paladins finished 3rd in the SoCon Southern Division during the regular season, and lost in the semifinals of the Southern Conference tournament to College of Charleston.

Furman failed to qualify for the NCAA tournament, but were invited to the 2011 CIT. The Paladins were eliminated in the first round of the tournament, losing to East Tennessee State, 76–63.

Roster 

Source

Schedule and results

|-
!colspan=9 style=|Exhibition

|-
!colspan=9 style=|Regular season

|-
!colspan=9 style=| SoCon tournament

|-
!colspan=9 style=| CollegeInsider.com tournament

Source

References

Furman Paladins men's basketball seasons
Furman
Furman
Furman men's basketball
Furman men's basketball